Superstar in a Housedress (2004) is a feature-length documentary by independent filmmaker Craig Highberger about the life and legend of Warhol superstar Jackie Curtis. Highberger also wrote the biography of the same name, published by Penguin imprint Chamberlain Bros. in 2005. The film includes interviews with surviving superstars Holly Woodlawn, Penny Arcade and Joe Dallesandro; as well as Paul Morrissey, the director of the Warhol films Flesh and Women In Revolt that Jackie appeared in; and Tony Award winners Harvey Fierstein, and Lily Tomlin who also narrates. The film also includes twenty friends and colleagues of Curtis who round out the story of the artist's life. Rare footage includes Curtis performing in Vain Victory, Heaven Grand in Amber Orbit, and Glamour, Glory and Gold.

References

External links

2004 films
2004 LGBT-related films
Documentary films about actors
American documentary films
Documentary films about women
Transgender-related documentary films
American LGBT-related films
Films about trans women
LGBT-related films based on actual events
Biographical films about LGBT people
2000s American films